Dryophylax chaquensis is a species of snake in the family Colubridae. The species is endemic to Brazil.

References

Snakes of South America
Reptiles of Brazil
Reptiles described in 1993
Dryophylax